Rocket science is a colloquial term for aerospace engineering and astrodynamics.

In popular terminology, it's not rocket science is a phrase meaning something that is not difficult to understand.

Rocket Science, It's Not Rocket Science and variants may also refer to:

Business 
 Rocket science in finance, a professional activity
 Rocket Science Games, a video game development company

Entertainment 
 Rocket Science (miniseries), a 2002 documentary series
 Rocket Science (film), a 2007 comedy-drama film
 Rocket Science (TV series), a 2009 BBC television series
 It Is Rocket Science, a 2011-14 BBC Radio 4 series
It's Not Rocket Science, a British television show that aired on ITV in 2016.guna prime channel have the video of it.

Music 
 Rocket Science (band), an Australian alternative rock band
 Rocket Science (Apoptygma Berzerk album), 2009
 Rocket Science (Hugh Blumenfeld album), by folk artist Hugh Blumenfeld
 Rocket Science (Tribal Tech album), by the jazz fusion band Tribal Tech
 Rocket Science (Béla Fleck and the Flecktones album), 2011
 Rocket Science (Wolf album), 2001
 Rocket Science (Rocket Science album), 2013
 Rocket Science (Rick Springfield album), 2016
 "Not Rocket Science" (song), a six-song music album released by Be Your Own Pet in 2007
 "Rocket Science", a song by Swedish group Icona Pop on the Spotify release of the album Icona Pop